This is a list of footballers who have received a winners' medal in the All-Ireland Senior Football Championship.

Currently, the Gaelic Athletic Association issues 26 medals to the winning team, however, the individual county board have the option of ordering extra medals for members of the extended panel or for players who may have played during the championship but missed the final due to injury.

All-Ireland Senior Football Championship
Gaelic football-related lists